Manatee Airport  is a public use airport serving the rural community of Spanish Lookout, Cayo District, Belize.

See also

Transport in Belize
List of airports in Belize

References

External links 
OpenStreetMap - Manatee Airport 
OurAirports - Manatee Airport
FallingRain - Manatee Airport
Aerodromes in Belize - pdf

Airports in Belize
Cayo District